Chungara (possibly from Aymara for "pointed mountain") is a mountain in the Chila mountain range in the Andes of Peru, about  high . It is located in the Arequipa Region, Caylloma Province, on the border of the districts of Caylloma and Tuti. It lies south of Jatunchungara ("big pointed mountain" or "big Chungara") and Mesa Chungara and northeast of Ticlla.

References

Mountains of Peru
Mountains of Arequipa Region